The Trofeo Baracchi was a major Italian cycling race that ran for 50 years.  It was created by Mino Baracchi, in memory of his father Angelo who was a great cycle racing fan. Originally (from 1941) an amateur individual time trial, from 1944 it was open to professionals and became a major event on the European calendar. Initially it took place every two years but from 1949 it became an annual event and adopted the two person team time trial format. It continued with this formula until 1990. The last running of the event in 1991 reverted to a solo time trial and also held as the Grand Prix des Nations.

Winners

External references
Mémoire du cyclisme
Riccardo Filippi, vincitore di tre edizioni

Cycle races in Italy
Defunct cycling races in Italy
Recurring sporting events established in 1941
1941 establishments in Italy
Recurring sporting events disestablished in 1991
UCI Road World Cup races
1991 disestablishments in Italy